Victoria Barracks was a military installation in Beverley, East Riding of Yorkshire, England.

History
The barracks were built as the depot of the two battalions of the 15th (The Yorkshire East Riding) Regiment of Foot between 1877 and 1878. Their creation took place as part of the Cardwell Reforms which encouraged the localisation of British military forces. Following the Childers Reforms, the 15th Regiment of Foot evolved to become the East Yorkshire Regiment with its depot at the barracks in 1881.

Many recruits enlisted at the barracks at the start of the First World War and the barracks were significantly extended during the Second World War. The Regiment amalgamated with the West Yorkshire Regiment to form the Prince of Wales's Own Regiment of Yorkshire in 1958. Following demolition of the barracks, the Ministry of Defence disposed of the site in 1977 and it is now largely occupied by a Morrisons supermarket.

References

 
Installations of the British Army
Barracks in England
Beverley